The 1977–78 NBA season was the Rockets' 11th season in the NBA and 7th season in the city of Houston.

Offseason

Draft picks

Roster

Regular season

Season standings

z – clinched division title
y – clinched division title
x – clinched playoff spot

Record vs. opponents

References

Houston Rockets seasons
Houston